In geometry, central lines are certain special straight lines that lie in the plane of a triangle. The special property that distinguishes a straight line as a central line is manifested via the equation of the line in trilinear coordinates. This special property is related to the concept of triangle center also. The concept of a central line was introduced by Clark Kimberling in a paper published in 1994.

Definition
Let  be a plane triangle and let  be the trilinear coordinates of an arbitrary point in the plane of triangle .

A straight line in the plane of triangle  whose equation in trilinear coordinates has the form
 
where the point with trilinear coordinates  is a triangle center, is a central line in the plane of triangle  relative to the triangle .

Central lines as trilinear polars
The geometric relation between a central line and its associated triangle center can be expressed using the concepts of trilinear polars and isogonal conjugates.

Let X = ( u ( a, b, c ) : v ( a, b, c ) : w ( a, b, c ) ) be a triangle center. The line whose equation is 
  x / u ( a, b, c )  + y / v ( a, b, c ) y + z / w ( a, b, c )  = 0 
is the trilinear polar of the triangle center X.  Also the point Y = ( 1 / u ( a, b, c ) : 1 / v ( a, b, c ) : 1 / w ( a, b, c ) ) is the isogonal conjugate of the triangle center X.

Thus the central line given by the equation
 f ( a, b, c ) x + g ( a, b, c ) y + h ( a, b, c ) z = 0
is the trilinear polar of the isogonal conjugate of the triangle center ( f ( a, b, c ) : g ( a, b, c ) : h ( a, b, c ) ).

Construction of central lines

Let X be any triangle center of the triangle ABC. 
Draw the lines AX, BX and CX and their reflections in the internal bisectors of the angles at the vertices A, B, C respectively.
The reflected lines are concurrent and the point of concurrence is the isogonal conjugate Y of X.
Let the cevians AY, BY, CY meet the opposite sidelines of triangle ABC at A' , B' , C'  respectively. The triangle A'B'C' is the cevian triangle of Y.
The triangle ABC and the cevian triangle A'B'C' are in perspective and let DEF be the axis of perspectivity of the two triangles. The line DEF is the trilinear polar of the point Y.  The line DEF is the central line associated with the triangle center X.

Some named central lines
Let Xn be the n th triangle center in Clark Kimberling's Encyclopedia of Triangle Centers. The central line associated with Xn is denoted by Ln. Some of the named central lines are given below.

Central line associated with X1, the incenter: Antiorthic axis 
The central line associated with the incenter X1 = ( 1 : 1 : 1 ) (also denoted by I) is 
 x + y + z = 0.
This line is the antiorthic axis of triangle ABC.

The isogonal conjugate of the incenter of a triangle ABC is the incenter itself. So the antiorthic axis, which is the  central line associated with the incenter, is the axis of perspectivity of the triangle ABC and  its incentral triangle (the cevian triangle of the incenter of triangle ABC).
The antiorthic axis of triangle ABC is the axis of perspectivity  of the triangle ABC and the excentral triangle I1I2I3 of triangle ABC.
The triangle whose sidelines are externally tangent to the excircles of triangle ABC is the extangents triangle of triangle ABC. A triangle ABC and its extangents triangle are in perspective and the axis of perspectivity is the antiorthic axis of triangle ABC.

Central line associated with X2, the centroid: Lemoine axis 
The trilinear coordinates of the centroid X2 (also denoted by G) of triangle ABC are ( 1 / a : 1 / b : 1 / c ). So the central line associated with the centroid is the line whose trilinear equation is 
 x / a + y / b + z / c = 0.
This line is the Lemoine axis, also called the Lemoine line,  of triangle ABC.

The isogonal conjugate of the centroid X2 is the symmedian point X6 (also denoted by K) having trilinear coordinates ( a : b : c ). So the Lemoine axis of triangle ABC is the trilinear polar of the symmedian point of triangle ABC.
The tangential triangle of triangle ABC is the triangle TATBTC formed by the tangents to the circumcircle of triangle ABC at its vertices. Triangle ABC and its tangential triangle are in perspective and the axis of perspectivity is the Lemoine axis of triangle ABC.

Central line associated with X3, the circumcenter: Orthic axis 

The trilinear coordinates of the circumcenter X3 (also denoted by O) of triangle ABC are ( cos A : cos B : cos C ). So the central line associated with the circumcenter is the line whose trilinear equation is 
 x cos A + y cos B + z cos C = 0. 
This line is the orthic axis of triangle ABC.

The isogonal conjugate of the circumcenter  X6 is the orthocenter X4 (also denoted by H) having trilinear coordinates ( sec A : sec B : sec C ). So the orthic axis of triangle ABC is the trilinear polar of the orthocenter of triangle ABC. The orthic axis of triangle ABC is the axis of perspectivity of triangle ABC and its orthic triangle HAHBHC.

Central line associated with X4, the orthocenter 

The trilinear coordinates of the orthocenter X4 (also denoted by H) of triangle ABC are ( sec A : sec B : sec C ). So the central line associated with the circumcenter is the line whose trilinear equation is 
 x sec A + y sec B + z sec C = 0.

The isogonal conjugate of the orthocenter of a triangle is the circumcenter of the triangle. So the central line associated with the orthocenter is the trilinear polar of the circumcenter.

Central line associated with X5, the nine-point center 

The trilinear coordinates of the nine-point center X5 (also denoted by N) of triangle ABC are ( cos ( B − C ) : cos ( C − A ) : cos ( A − B ) ).  So the central line associated with the nine-point center is the line whose trilinear equation is 
 x cos ( B − C )   + y cos ( C − A ) + z  cos ( A − B )  = 0.

The isogonal conjugate of the nine-point center of triangle ABC is the Kosnita point X54 of triangle ABC.   So the central line associated with the nine-point center is the trilinear polar of the Kosnita point.
The Kosnita point is constructed as follows. Let O be the circumcenter of triangle ABC. Let OA, OB, OC  be the circumcenters of the triangles BOC, COA, AOB respectively. The lines AOA, BOB, COC are concurrent and the point of concurrence is the Kosnita point of triangle ABC. The name is due to J Rigby.

Central line associated with X6, the symmedian point : Line at infinity 

The trilinear coordinates of the symmedian point X6 (also denoted by K) of triangle ABC are ( a : b : c ). So the central line associated with the symmedian point is the line whose trilinear equation is 
 a x + b y + c z =0.

This line is the line at infinity in the plane of triangle ABC.
The isogonal conjugate of the symmedian point of triangle ABC is the centroid of triangle ABC. Hence the central line associated with the symmedian point is the trilinear polar of the centroid. This is the axis of perspectivity of the triangle ABC and its medial triangle.

Some more named central lines

Euler line

Euler line of triangle ABC is the line passing through the centroid, the circumcenter, the orthocenter and the nine-point center of triangle ABC. The trilinear equation of the Euler line is 
 x sin 2A sin ( B − C ) + y sin 2B sin ( C − A ) + z sin 2C sin ( C − A )   = 0.
This is the central line associated with the triangle center X647.

Nagel line

Nagel line of triangle ABC is the line passing through the centroid, the incenter, the Spieker center and the Nagel point of triangle ABC. The trilinear equation of the Nagel line is
 x a ( b − c ) + y b ( c − a ) + z c ( a − b ) = 0.
This is the central line associated with the triangle center X649.

Brocard axis

The Brocard axis of triangle ABC is the line through the circumcenter and the symmedian point of triangle ABC. Its trilinear equation is
 x sin (B − C ) + y sin ( C − A ) + z sin ( A − B ) = 0.
This is the central line associated with the triangle center X523.

See also

Trilinear polarity
Triangle conic
 Modern triangle geometry

References

Straight lines defined for a triangle